Ferdinand Kaindl (born 1901, date of death unknown) was an Austrian sprinter. He competed in the men's 100 metres event at the 1924 Summer Olympics.

References

External links
 

1901 births
Year of death missing
Athletes (track and field) at the 1924 Summer Olympics
Austrian male sprinters
Olympic athletes of Austria